The Ramdane Djamel-Annaba line is a railway connecting Annaba Province to the Algiers-Skikda line and the rest of the Algerian rail network. Currently 96 kilometers long, this is the oldest railroad in the country.

History 
An 11 kilometer segment of the current line started construction in 1853 and opened on September 1, 1859 for cargo operations in the immediate vicinity of Annaba.

The line first opened for passenger service in 1885 and had all its segments joined in 1904. Since 2006, the line is being upgraded by the National Company for Rail Transport.

Double-tracking work commenced in 2006 in order to facilitate long-distance travel connecting with the Algiers-Skikda line and includes 27 kilometers of new alignment, two tunnels measuring a total of 2 kilometers, and station reconstruction in the towns of Azzaba and Berrahal. The work is being performed by Obrascón Huarte Lain for approximately €200 million.

Line description 
The line is single-track and not electrified. There is a total of four stations on the line: Annaba, Berrahal, Azzaba, and Ramdane Djamel. Services on this line average 40-50 km/h.

Services 
One night train connects Algiers station to Annaba, taking 10 hours over 630 kilometers using the Algiers-Skikda line and the Ramdane Djamel-Annaba line. Only freight service operates between Annaba and Skikda.

References 

Railway lines in Algeria